Encomium Magazine is a Nigerian magazine published by Encomium Ventures Limited. The magazine has started publishing since 1997. Its head office is located in Ikeja, Lagos. 

Encomium Magazine is among the top selling soft sell magazine in Nigeria. Its coverage includes celebrity gossip, health, style and wellbeing.

References

External links
 Official website

1997 establishments in Nigeria
Celebrity magazines
English-language magazines
Magazines established in 1997
Magazines published in Lagos
Magazines published in Nigeria
Weekly magazines